Edme Dumont (1720–1775) was a French sculptor.

Dumont was born into a family of sculptors: his father was François Dumont, his grandfather Pierre Dumont. He received his first lessons from his father, and was admitted to the Académie royale de peinture et de sculpture in 1768, with his reception piece Milo of Croton. He married Marie Berthault and they had a son, the sculptor Jacques-Edme Dumont. On 10 November 1775 he died at his home at the Louvre Palace and was buried the next day in the Holy Innocents' Cemetery.

References
  Collective Acts of civil status of artists, Slatkine, 1972, p. 125/478. Archives of baptisms, marriages and burials of the parish of Saint-Germain l'Auxerrois
 Dictionary of sculptors of the French school in the eighteenth century. Volume 2 by Stanislas Lami

External links
 

1720 births
1775 deaths
18th-century French sculptors
French male sculptors
Artists from Paris
18th-century French male artists